Manuel de Toni (born 10 January 1979 in Feltre, Italy) is an Italian professional ice hockey player who participated at the 2010 IIHF World Championship as a member of the Italian National men's ice hockey team.

References

1979 births
Ice hockey players at the 2006 Winter Olympics
Italian ice hockey centres
Living people
Olympic ice hockey players of Italy
People from Feltre
Sportspeople from the Province of Belluno